Pomasia luteata is a moth in the family Geometridae. It is found on Borneo and Peninsular Malaysia. The species is found from lowland areas to the upper montane zone.

The length of the forewings is 9–10 mm.

References

Moths described in 1997
Eupitheciini